Françoise Cantamessa (born 12 November 1968) is a Swiss equestrian. She competed in two events at the 2000 Summer Olympics.

References

1968 births
Living people
Swiss female equestrians
Swiss dressage riders
Olympic equestrians of Switzerland
Equestrians at the 2000 Summer Olympics
People from Zug
Sportspeople from the canton of Zug